Vikas means expanding, progress or development in Sanskrit. It is often used as a masculine given name in Greater India. You would find people with this name mostly in North Indian states. Vikas and Pragati both means development. But Vikas name is given to males while Pragati to females.

Notable people

Bikas 
 Bikas K. Chakrabarti (born 1952), Indian physicist
 Bikas Mishra, Indian Filmmaker

Bikash 
Bikash Bhattacharjee (1940–2006), Indian painter from Kolkata in West Bengal
Bikash Ranjan Bhattacharya, Indian politician
Bikash Bista (born 1965), Director General of Central Bureau of Statistics of Nepal
Charu Bikash Chakma, Bangladeshi Chakma politician
Bikash Singh Chhetri (born 1992), footballer from Nepal
Bikash Chowdhury (1932–2005), Indian politician
Bikash Chowdhury (cricketer) (1938–2019), Indian former cricketer
Bikash Dali (born 1980), Nepalese cricketer
Bikash Jairu (born 1990), Indian professional footballer
Bikash Malla (born 1986), footballer from Nepal
Bikash Panji, Indian football Midfielder
Bikash Roy, actor in Bengali cinema
Bikash Sarkar (born 1965), Bengali poet, writer, journalist and editor
Bikash Sinha, Indian physicist, active in nuclear physics and high energy physics

Vikas 
 Vikas (actor) (born 1975), Indian actor
 Vikas Anand, Indian actor
 Vikas Bahl (born 1971), Indian film producer, director
 Vikas Bhalla (born 1972), Indian actor and singer
 Vikas Dubey (1964–2020), Indian history-sheeter and gangster
 Vikas Gowda (born 1983), discus thrower
 Vikas Gupta, American businessman
 Vikas Gupta, Indian television producer
 Vikas Joshi, Indian businessman
 Vikas Kalantri (born 1978), Hindi actor
 Vikas Kashalkar (born 1950), Hindustani classical vocalist
 Vikas Khanna (born 1971), Indian chef
 Vikas Kohli, Canadian musician and producer
 Vikas Krishan Yadav (born 1992), Indian boxer
 Vikas Kumar (born 1977), Indian dialogue coach and actor
 Vikas Mahatme (born 1957), eye surgeon
 Vikas Manaktala (born 1987), Indian actor
 Vikas Mishra (born 1992), Indian cricketer
 Vikas Mishra (economist) (1924–2008), Indian economist
 Vikas Sethi (born 1976), Indian actor
 Vikas Shankarrao Kumbhare, Indian politician
 Vikas Swarup, Indian novelist and diplomat 
 Vikas Upadhyay, Indian politician
 Vikas Uppal (1986–2007), said to be India's tallest man
 Vikas Yadav (murderer) (born 20th century), Indian criminal
 Vikas Thakur (born 1989), Indian weightlifter
 Vikas Tokas (born 1986), Indian cricketer
 Vikas Jain (born Unknown), Indian businessman, co-founder of Micromax Informatics Limited
 Vikas Kumar (born 1993), Human Accountant, founder of Human Intelligence, a virtual start up

References

See also 
 Bika (surname)

Indian masculine given names